The 1988 NCAA Division I softball tournament was the seventh annual tournament to determine the national champion of NCAA women's collegiate softball. Held during May 1988, twenty Division I college softball teams contested the championship, an expansion of four teams from the previous year. The tournament featured eight regionals of either two or three teams. The regions of two teams consisted of a simple best-of-three series whereas the regions of three teams consisted of a double elimination tournament of four or five games. The 1988 Women's College World Series was held in Sunnyvale, California from May 25 through May 29 and marked the conclusion of the 1988 NCAA Division I softball season. UCLA won the championship by defeating  3–0 in the final game.

The 1988 event was the first WCWS played in Sunnyvale.

Qualifying

Regionals

At-large Regional

Fresno State qualifies for WCWS, 2–1

Central Regional

First elimination round
Creighton 3, Iowa State 2
Nebraska 5, Iowa State 2
Creighton 3, Nebraska 2

Second elimination round

Nebraska qualifies for WCWS, 3–1

Mideast Regional

First elimination round
South Carolina 1, Minnesota 0
Arizona 5, Minnesota 0
South Carolina 1, Arizona 0

Second elimination round

Arizona qualifies for WCWS, 3–1

Midwest Regional

First elimination round
Northern Illinois 4, Bowling Green 3
Illinois State 2, Bowling Green 1 (10 innings)
Illinois State 1, Northern Illinois 0

Second elimination round

Northern Illinois qualifies for WCWS, 3–1

Northeast Regional

Adelphi qualifies for WCWS, 2–1

Northwest Regional

UCLA qualifies for WCWS, 2–0

South Regional

First elimination round
Texas A&M 1, Florida State 0
Louisiana Tech 6, Florida State 1
Texas A&M 2, Louisiana Tech 0

Second elimination round

Texas A&M qualifies for WCWS, 3–1

West Regional

Cal Poly Pomona qualifies for WCWS, 2–0

Women's College World Series

Participants

UCLA

Game results

Bracket

Game log

Championship Game

All-Tournament Team
The following players were named to the All-Tournament Team

See also
NCAA Division I Softball Championship
Women's College World Series
NCAA Division II Softball Championship
NCAA Division III Softball Championship
College World Series

References

1988 NCAA Division I softball season
NCAA Division I softball tournament